Elections for the Uttarakhand Legislative Assembly (Uttarakhand Vidhan Sabha) in Uttarakhand state, India are conducted in accordance with the Constitution of India. The legislative assembly of Uttarakhand creates laws regarding the conduct of local body elections unilaterally while any changes by the state legislature to the conduct of state level elections need to be approved by the Parliament of India. In addition, the state legislature may be dismissed by the Parliament according to Article 356 of the Indian Constitution and President's rule may be imposed.

Major political parties 
The Bharatiya Janata Party, Indian National Congress have been the most popular parties in the state since its inception. Other influential parties include, Bahujan Samaj Party, Samajwadi Party, Aam Aadmi Party and Uttarakhand Kranti Dal.

Lok Sabha elections 

Keys:

Vidhan Sabha elections 

Keys:

1st Assembly Election, 2002 

2002 Uttarakhand Legislative Assembly elections were the first Vidhan Sabha (Legislative Assembly) elections held in the state. The Interim Uttarakhand Assembly was led by Chief Minister Bhagat Singh Koshyari prior to the election, but no chief ministerial candidate was named before the elections. The Indian National Congress emerged as the largest party with 36 seats in the 70-seat legislature whereas the Bharatiya Janata Party secured the second place with 19 seats. Veteran Congress leader N. D. Tiwari was chosen as the new Chief Minister despite him not being a member of the legislative assembly. He later won the by-election held to the Ramnagar constituency.

2nd Assembly Election, 2007 

2007 Uttarakhand state assembly elections were the second Vidhan Sabha elections held in the state. The Bharatiya Janata Party emerged as the single largest party with 35 seats in the 70-seat legislature. One seat short of forming a majority, the BJP had to rely on the support of the Uttarakhand Kranti Dal and three independents to form the government. Former Union Minister B. C. Khanduri became the new Chief Minister despite him not being a member of the legislative assembly. He later won the by-election held to the Dhumakot constituency. The Indian National Congress was the official opposition, holding 21 seats.

3rd Assembly Election, 2012 

2012 Uttarakhand state assembly elections were the third Vidhan Sabha elections held in the state.
Uttarakhand had turned out incumbent governments in the first two elections held in the state since its formation. The ruling Bharatiya Janata Party fought the election under the leadership of its Chief Minister B. C. Khanduri. The main opposition Indian National Congress was led in the assembly by Harak Singh Rawat, but no chief ministerial candidate was named before the elections. The interim tenure of former Chief Minister Ramesh Pokhriyal, which was marked by large-scale corruption accusations, was likely to be the main election issue.

The elections took place on 30 January, with the results being announced on 6 March. In a closely contested election, the Indian National Congress emerged as the single largest party with 32 seats followed by the Bharatiya Janata Party with 31 seats. Notably the incumbent Chief minister B. C. Khanduri lost from his seat. Vijay Bahuguna was appointed as Chief minister despite him not being a member of the legislative assembly. He later won the by-election held to the Sitarganj constituency.

4th Assembly Election, 2017 

2017 Uttarakhand state assembly elections were the fourth Vidhan Sabha elections held in the state. The Bharatiya Janata Party riding on the popularity of Prime Minister Narendra Modi, secured a record landslide victory, winning 57 of the total 70 seats. The ruling Indian National Congress was reduced to a record low of 11 seats, with the incumbent Chief Minister Harish Rawat himself losing from both the seats that he had contested from. Although the BJP had not projected anyone as its chief ministerial candidate, Trivendra Singh Rawat was chosen as the new Chief Minister after the elections. In 2021, Tirath Singh Rawat briefly became the Chief Minister, followed by Pushkar Singh Dhami.

5th Assembly Election, 2022 
2022 Uttarakhand state assembly elections were the fifth Vidhan Sabha elections held in the state. The Bharatiya Janata Party, despite its tally of seats shrinking significantly, secured a  landslide victory, winning 47 of the total 70 seats. It was the first time in the history of Uttarakhand when the ruling party came back to power in the state winning back-to-back assembly elections, although the incumbent Chief Minister Pushkar Singh Dhami lost his seat. The main opposition Indian National Congress bagged 19 seats, with their party leader Harish Rawat also losing from his seat once again.

See also
Local elections in Uttarakhand
List of by-elections to the Uttarakhand Legislative Assembly

References

External links
  
 http://eci.gov.in/eci_main/StatisticalReports/AE2012/Statistical_Report_UKT2012.pdf
 parliamentary Lok Sabha elections 2014 in uttarakhand

 
Government of Uttarakhand
Politics of Uttarakhand